Jorge Wilstermann (23 April 1910 – 17 January 1936) was the first Bolivian commercial pilot. The son of a mechanic who worked for Lloyd Aéreo Boliviano, Wilstermann took an interest in aviation, and became Bolivia's first civilian aviator. Jorge Wilstermann died in 1936, after an aeroplane accident when flying the Cochabamba–Oruro route on his Junkers airplane. Wilstermann's pioneerism inspired homages in Bolivia. His friend and the then boss of Lloyd Aéreo Boliviano, Wálter Lemm, requested that the name of the local airport in Cochabamba and the local football team's name (which was started by people involved in aviation, workers for Lloyd Aéreo Boliviano) be changed to Jorge Wilstermann in his honour.

See also
Club Jorge Wilstermann
Jorge Wilstermann International Airport

References

1910 births
1936 deaths
Bolivian aviators
Bolivian people of German descent
People from Punata Province
Victims of aviation accidents or incidents in Bolivia
Commercial aviators